Serrolepis is an extinct genus of prehistoric bony fish. It was a highly-specialized small stem-neopterygian with strong jaws and a short head. Body shape is variable and known material appears to fall within several size classes & two morphotypes. Fossils of Serrolepis are known from the Middle Triassic Erfurt Formation of Germany.

See also

 Prehistoric fish
 List of prehistoric bony fish

References

External links
 Bony fish in the online Sepkoski Database

Prehistoric neopterygii
Prehistoric bony fish genera